Alan Green may refer to:

 Alan Green (admiral) (born 1952), retired South African Navy admiral
 Alan Green (broadcaster) (born 1952), British sports commentator on BBC Radio Five Live
 Alan Green (Cleethorpes politician) (1932–2003), Cleethorpes mayor and local politician
 Alan Green (footballer, born 1951), English footballer
 Alan Green (footballer, born 1954), former North American Soccer League player
 Alan Green (MP) (1911–1991), British Conservative Party politician
 Alan Green Jr. (1925–2001), United States ambassador to Romania
  (1906–1975), American writer, see 1950 in List of Edgar Allan Poe Award for Best First Novel winners

See also
 Allan Green (disambiguation)
 Al Green (disambiguation)
 Alan Greene (1911–2001), American diver